Duau Rural LLG is a local-level government (LLG) of Milne Bay Province, Papua New Guinea. The Duau language is spoken in the LLG.

Wards
01. Kalologea
02. Sawatupwa
03. Mwatebu
04. Sawataatae
05. Lomitawa
06. Sipupu
07. Wayoko
08. Maudana
09. Kwanauia
10. Loboda
11. Siausi
12. Dawada
13. Sigasiga
14. Sapisapia
15. Bihawa
16. Somwadina
17. Mwalakwasia
18. Kasikasi
19. Kumwalau
20. Kalotau
21. Barabara
22. Bunama
23. Gumali
24. Isumayaumayau
25. Pwanapwana
26. Sibonai
27. Bwasiyaiyai
28. Kurada

References

Local-level governments of Milne Bay Province